Albert Leo Schlageter (12 August 1894 – 26 May 1923) was a German military officer who joined a Freikorps group after World War I and became famous for acts of post-war sabotage against French occupational forces. Schlageter was arrested for sabotaging a section of railroad track and executed by the French military. The manner of his death fostered an aura of martyrdom around him, which was cultivated by German nationalist groups, in particular the Nazi Party. In Nazi Germany, he was commemorated as a national hero.

Life 
Schlageter was born in Schönau im Schwarzwald to Catholic parents.

After the outbreak of the First World War, he became a voluntary emergency worker for the military. During the war, he participated in several battles, notably Ypres (1915), the Somme (1916) and Verdun, earning the Iron Cross second and first class. Following his promotion to leutnant, he took part in the Third Battle of Ypres (1917). After the war and his dismissal from the greatly reduced army, Schlageter described himself as a student of political sciences, but he studied the subject at the most for one year.

About this time, he became a member of a right-wing student group. Soon, in March 1919, he joined the Baden Freikorps and fought against the Bolsheviks as a part of the Baltische Landeswehr during the capture of Riga in May during the Latvian War of Independence. After the Landwehr was defeated in the Battle of Cēsis, he joined the German Legion of the West Russian Volunteer Army led by Pavel Bermondt-Avalov. In December 1919, after Avalov's forces were defeated by the Latvian Army and after a short time in Lithuania, Schlageter returned to Germany.

In 1920 he took part in the Kapp Putsch and other battles between military and communist factions that were convulsing Germany. His unit also took part in the Silesian Uprisings fighting on the German side.

Already close to Nazis, around the time of the Battle of Annaberg of 1921 Schlageter's unit merged with the emerging Nazi Party. During the Third Silesian Uprising of 1921 Schlageter became infamous for persecuting local people and for terrorist actions against both Poles and Germans whom he and his group perceived as opposing his cause.

Following the French occupation of the Ruhr in 1923 he led a group of nationalists in sabotage operations against the occupying force. The group managed to derail a number of trains. On 7 April 1923 information on Schlageter and his activities was obtained by the French, and he was arrested the following day. Tried by court-martial on 7 May 1923, he was condemned to death. On the morning of 26 May he was executed by firing squad on the Golzheimer heath near Düsseldorf. 

On 8 May Schlageter had written to his parents: "from 1914 until today I have sacrificed my whole strength to work for my German homeland, from love and pure loyalty. Where it was suffering, it drew me, in order to help… I was no gang leader, but in quiet labour I sought to help my fatherland. I did not commit any common crime or murder."

Almost immediately after Schlageter's death, Rudolf Höss murdered his alleged betrayer, Walther Kadow. He was assisted by Martin Bormann. Höss was sentenced to ten years but only served four; Bormann received a one-year sentence.

Heroic symbol to Nazism

After his execution he became a hero to some sections of the German population. Immediately after his death a Schlageter Memorial Society was formed, which agitated for the creation of a monument to honour him. The German Communist Party sought to debunk the emerging mythology of Schlageter by circulating a speech by Karl Radek portraying him as an honourable but misguided figure. It was the Nazi party who most fully exploited the Schlageter story.
Rituals were constructed to commemorate his death, and in 1931 the Memorial Society succeeded in getting a monument erected near the site of his execution. This was a giant cross placed amid sunken stone rings. Other smaller memorials were also created.
 
After 1933 Schlageter became one of the principal heroes of the Nazi regime, along with Horst Wessel, a Nazi stormtrooper who had been killed by Communists in Berlin in 1930.

In June 1933, Nazis from the Passau region gathered at the Dreisessel Mountain in the Bavaria Forest to dedicate a Schlageter Memorial. In September 1933, the city of Passau dedicated its own memorial on Hammerberg, overlooking the Inn River. In the spring of 1938, Passau added a Schlageter street and a Schlageter Plaza.

Hanns Johst, the Nazi playwright, wrote  (1933), a biographical drama. It was dedicated to Hitler, and was performed on his first anniversary in power as a theatrical manifesto of Nazism. The line "when I hear the word culture, I reach for my gun", often misattributed to Nazi leaders, derives from this play. The original line is slightly different: "" "Whenever I hear of culture... I release the safety-catch of my Browning!" (Act 1, Scene 1). It is spoken by another character in conversation with the young Schlageter.

Several important military ventures were also named for him, including the Jagdgeschwader 26 Schlageter fighter-wing of the Luftwaffe, and the naval vessel Albert Leo Schlageter. An army barracks on the south side of Freiburg was also named after him; after World War II, the site of this barracks was occupied by the French army and renamed Quartier Vauban after the French military architect. (When the French left in the 1990s, the area became the site of the eco-friendly suburb of Vauban.

Schlageter also featured as a prominent character in British author Geoffrey Moss's 1933 novel I Face the Stars, about the rise of Nazism.

After the war, the main Schlageter memorial was destroyed by occupying Allied forces as part of the denazification process. The Schlageter memorial in Ringelai near Freyung, however, existed until 1977.

The  or "Schlageter Island" near Soltau continues to bear the name.

References

External links

German biography of Schlageter
German text of Schlageter Schauspiel
 

1894 births
1923 deaths
20th-century Freikorps personnel
20th-century executions by France
People from Schönau im Schwarzwald
People from the Grand Duchy of Baden
German Roman Catholics
German Army personnel of World War I
Executed people from Baden-Württemberg
People executed by the French Third Republic
Baltische Landeswehr personnel
People executed by France by firing squad